The 1996 Western Australian state election was held on 14 December 1996.

Retiring Members

Labor
Mike Barnett MLA (Rockingham)
Kay Hallahan MLA (Armadale)
Yvonne Henderson MLA (Thornlie)
David Smith MLA (Mitchell)
Graham Edwards MLC (North Metropolitan)
Valma Ferguson MLC (East Metropolitan)
Doug Wenn MLC (South West)

Liberal
Barry Blaikie MLA (Vasse)
Jim Clarko MLA (Marmion)
Richard Lewis MLA (Applecross)
Wayde Smith MLA (Wanneroo)
Clive Griffiths MLC (South Metropolitan)
Phil Lockyer MLC (Mining and Pastoral)

Legislative Assembly
Sitting members are shown in bold text. Successful candidates are highlighted in the relevant colour. Where there is possible confusion, an asterisk (*) is also used.

Legislative Council
Sitting members are shown in bold text. Tickets that elected at least one MLC are highlighted in the relevant colour. Successful candidates are identified by an asterisk (*).

Agricultural
Five seats were up for election. The Labor Party was defending one seat. The Liberal Party was defending two seats. The National Party was defending two seats.

East Metropolitan
Five seats were up for election. The Labor Party was defending three seats. The Liberal Party was defending two seats.

Mining and Pastoral
Five seats were up for election. The Labor Party was defending three seats. The Liberal Party was defending two seats.

North Metropolitan
Seven seats were up for election. The Labor Party was defending two seats. The Liberal Party was defending four seats. Independent MLC Reg Davies was defending one seat.

South Metropolitan
Five seats were up for election. The Labor Party was defending two seats. The Liberal Party was defending two seats. The Greens WA were defending one seat.

South West
Seven seats were up for election. The Labor Party was defending three seats. The Liberal Party was defending three seats. The National Party was defending one seat.

See also
 Members of the Western Australian Legislative Assembly, 1993–1996
 Members of the Western Australian Legislative Assembly, 1996–2001
 Members of the Western Australian Legislative Council, 1993–1997
 Members of the Western Australian Legislative Council, 1997–2001
 1996 Western Australian state election

References
Green, Antony. 1996 Western Australian election results. Australian Broadcasting Corporation

Candidates for Western Australian state elections